Marc Bolle (born 24 June 1949) is a Belgian former professional tennis player.

Bolle, a native of Ghent, competed in the main draw of the 1969 Australian Open and was beaten in the first round by the sixth seed Pancho Gonzales. He went on to play collegiate tennis for the University of Tennessee in the early 1970s.

References

External links
 
 

1949 births
Living people
Belgian male tennis players
Tennessee Volunteers men's tennis players
Sportspeople from Ghent